Abbs is a surname.
 Notable people with the surname include:

 Annabel Abbs (born 1964), English author
 John Abbs (1810–1888), English missionary
 Louisa Sewell Abbs (1811–1872), English missionary
 Peter Abbs (1942–2020), English academic
 Tom Abbs (born 1972), American musician
 Walter Abbs, namesake of the Walter Abbs House

See also 
 Mount Abbs, mountain in Antarctica
 St. Abbs, village in Berwickshire, Scotland
 Acta Biochimica et Biophysica Sinica (ABBS)
 ABB (disambiguation)

References 

Surnames of English origin